Nikolai Vladimirovich Pereverzev (born 15 December 1986) is a retired Russian futsal player who last played for MFK Tyumen and the Russian national team.

References

External links
UEFA profile
AMFR profile

1986 births
Living people
Russian men's futsal players